A Foreign Affair is a 2003 film directed by Helmut Schleppi. The film takes place during an actual romance tour, with attendees as actors and extras throughout the film.

Plot
Two brothers need household help after their Ma passes away. They decide to join a romance tour to Russia to find and bring home a traditionally minded wife.

Notes

External links
 
 
 
 

2003 films
American independent films
2003 comedy-drama films
American comedy-drama films
2003 independent films
2000s English-language films
2000s American films